(Ernest) John Robertson (21 October 1943) is a New Zealand born Canadian composer of concert music. He received his preliminary musical educational as part of his schooling in New Zealand. Upon emigrating to Canada in 1967 he took a position in the general insurance business but in the mid 1970s he embarked on a course of private study in composition and counterpoint at the Royal Conservatory of Music in Toronto with Dr Sam Dolin. In 1987 an entry in a composition competition won him a performance of his Variations for small orchestra Op 14, and since then his music has been heard in Canada, Australia, Mexico, the UK, Sweden and Bulgaria. In 2014 after some orchestral pieces of his were played in Ruse, Bulgaria, the Ruse State Opera asked him to write an opera and the one hour long Orpheus was staged there in June 2015 and was revived in February and May 2016, and in June 2017.

Personal life
He currently resides in Kingston, Ontario, Canada

Works (selection)

Symphonies 

 Symphony No. 1 op. 18 (1986)
 Symphony No. 2, op. 63 (2014)
 Symphony No. 3, op. 71 (2017)
 Symphony No. 4, op. 73 (2017)
 Symphony No. 5, op. 76 (2018)

Orchestral works 

 Overture for a Musical Comedy, op. 15 (1985)
 Salome Dances, op. 32A (1991)
 Cyrano, op. 53 (2009)
 Variations for small Orchestra, op. 14 (1985)
 Hinemoa and Tutanekai, for Flute and String Orchestra, op. 22 (1987)
 Suite for Orchestra, op. 46 (2005)
 Vallarta Suite, op. 47 (2006–08)
 Strut In - A March, op. 34 (1993)
 Concerto for Clarinet and Strings, op. 27 (1989)
 Concerto for Trumpet and Orchestra, op. 58 (2013)
 Suite from the opera "Orpheus" op. 64 bis (2017)
 The Death of Crowe, op. 30 (1990)

Works for Chamber Orchestra 

 Serenade for Strings
 Serenade in G
 Autumn Ramble

Operas 

 Orpheus - A Masque

Theatre pieces 

 Lady Jane - A Fable

References
 "Lady Jane" First performance in Rusé, Bulgaria 2/June/2017 paired with "Orpheus"
 
Re "Orpheus" Overture performance "the piece was gorgeous ... I want to hear this piece again" Puerto Vallarta Daily News 26/3/2015
lgso.org.uk 2009/10 season 4/7/2010,

External links

Videos of Compositions recorded in Ruse, Bulgaria in September 2014 by the Ruse Philharmonic conducted by Anthony Armore
 https://www.youtube.com/channel/UCIv-_FejPRu3Lb1REiLICBg

IMSLP's :
 http://imslp.org/wiki/Category:Robertson,_Ernest_John

Footnotes

Living people
1943 births
Canadian composers
Canadian male composers
New Zealand emigrants to Canada
Musicians from Kingston, Ontario
Musicians from Auckland